Higher Power is a term used in the Alcoholics Anonymous and other twelve-step programs.

Higher Power may also refer to:

Music
 Higher Power (band), a British hardcore punk band
 Higher Power (Big Audio Dynamite album), 1994
 Higher Power (The Dirty Nil album), 2016
 "Higher Power" (song), by Coldplay, 2021
 "Higher Power" (Anna Bergendahl song), 2022
 "Higher Power", a song by Boston from Greatest Hits, 1997

Other uses
 Higher Power (film), a 2018 American science fiction film
 "Higher Power" (seaQuest DSV), a television episode
 "A Higher Power" (Criminal Minds), a television episode
 Higher Power, a wrestling name used in the WWE by Vince McMahon

See also
Deity
God
Conceptions of God
Exponentiation, the use of lower and higher "powers" in mathematics